Kevin Talvinder Sandher (born 16 July 1980) is a Canadian cricket player. He made his debut for Canada against Barbados on 30 October 1999, and has played for Canada on 33 occasions in all. His One Day International debut came on 16 May 2006 against Zimbabwe in Trinidad. He also represented a combined Americas team in the Under 19 World Cup in 2000.

External links
 

1980 births
Living people
Sandher, Kevin
Sandher, Kevin
Canadian cricketers
Sportspeople from Vancouver